Meleh-ye Amiri (also Romanized as Meleh-ye Amīrī) is a village in Dowreh Rural District, Chegeni District, Dowreh County, Lorestan Province, Iran. At the 2006 census, its population was 115, in 23 families.

References 

Towns and villages in Dowreh County